The culture of Papua New Guinea is many-sided and complex. It is estimated that more than 7000 different cultural groups exist in Papua New Guinea, and most groups have their own language. Because of this diversity, in which they take pride, many different styles of cultural expression have emerged; each group has created its own expressive forms in art, dance, weaponry, costumes, singing, music, architecture and much more. To unify the nation, the language Tok Pisin, once called Neo-Melanesian (or Pidgin English) has evolved as the lingua franca — the medium through which diverse language groups are able to communicate with one another in Parliament, in the news media, and elsewhere. People typically live in villages or dispersed hamlets which rely on the subsistence farming of yams and taro. The principal livestock in traditional Papua New Guinea is the oceanic pig (Sus papuensis).

History

Traditions
 

On the Sepik River, there is a world-renowned tradition of wood carving. These carvers create forms of plants or animals, because they believe these are their ancestor beings and because they feel they are beautiful. They also create traditional skull portraits. Also well represented in the collections of museums around the world is the Malagan art tradition of New Ireland.

Even though sea shells are no longer the currency of Papua New Guinea - sea shells were abolished as currency in 1933 - this heritage is still present in local customs. In certain parts of the country a groom must bring a bride price to the wedding ceremony. In some cases this is paid in golden-edged clam shells. In other areas, a dowry is payable rather than bride price. These payments may take the form of shell money, food, pigs, cash, or other goods. In some parts of the New Guinea highlands, people engage in colorful local rituals that are called "sing-sings". They paint themselves and dress up with feathers, pearls and animal skins to represent birds, trees or mountain spirits. Sometimes an important event, such as a legendary battle, would be enacted at such a musical festival.

Music

Traditional music
 Christian missionaries disapproved of Papuan folk music throughout the colonial period of the country's history. Even after independence, the outside world knew little of the diverse peoples' traditional music genres. The first commercial release to see an international audience didn't occur until 1991 (see 1991 in music), when Mickey Hart's Voices of the Rainforest was released. After 1872, foreigners introduced Christian hymns, including Gregorian chanting. Peroveta anedia, ute and taibubu, all forms of Polynesian music, were also introduced in this period. The Gold Rush brought an influx of Australian miners who brought with them the mouth organ. Traditional celebrations, which include song, dance, feasting and gift-giving, are called singsings. Vibrant and colorful costumes adorn the dancers, while a leader and a chorus sing a staggered approach to the same song, producing a fugue-like effect. 1993 saw television spreading across the country, and American popular music continued to affect Papuan music given the diffusion of radio since WWII. Since 1953, singsings have become competitive in nature, with contests occurring in Port Moresby, Mt. Hagen and Goroka. 1949 saw the first Papuan to achieve international fame, Blasius To Una, begin his career.

Popular music
Radio broadcasting of western popular music began by the late 1930s. String bands became very popular by the early 1950s, and soon dominated the pop landscape. In the late 1960s, rock bands like the Kopikats had appeared in cities, while string bands like the Paramana Strangers had become well known internationally. This was followed by the importation of bamboo bands, a style of music from the Solomon Islands using bamboo tubes played by hitting them with sandals. It first arrived in the area of Madang in the mid-1970s, and soon spread throughout the country. By the end of the '70s, a local recording industry had appeared and artists like Sanguma and, later, George Telek, began mixing native and Western styles like rock music and jazz.

Literature
 
Ulli Beier, a lecturer in English Literature at the University of Papua New Guinea since 1967 was crucial in encouraging young writers and getting their work published. From 1969 to 1974 he was the editor of Kovave, a journal of New Guinea literature. He also published Papua Pocket Poets, and Pidgin Pocket Plays. Kovave ceased publication in 1974 but was replaced by the journal New Guinea Writing although this concentrated on folk tales. Natachee was the first Papuan poet to appear in print. The first autobiography was Albert Maori Kiki's Kiki in 1974. The first novel was Crocodile (1970) by Vincent Eri.

Visual arts
 
 
There is a rich and diverse tradition of visual art. In particular, Papua New Guinea is world-famous for carved wooden sculpture: masks, canoes, story-boards. Many of the best collections of these are held in overseas museums. Those identified as being in the first wave of contemporary art in Papua New Guinea are: Mathias Kauage OBE (1944–2003), Timothy Akis, Jakupa Ako and Joe Nalo, all from the tough urban area of Port Moresby. Kauage won Australia's Blake Prize for Religious Art, four of his works are in the Glasgow Museum of Modern Art, and he had a solo show in 2005 at the Horniman Museum, "Kauage's Visions: Art from Papua New Guinea". Other noted Papua New Guinean visual artists include Larry Santana, Martin Morububuna and Heso Kiwi.

Sport
 
Sports are hugely popular in Papua New Guinea, and its citizens participate in and watch a wide variety. Popular sports include various codes of football (rugby league, rugby union, Association Football, and Australian rules football), cricket, volleyball, softball, netball, and basketball. Other Olympic sports are also gaining popularity, such as boxing and weightlifting. Rugby league is the most popular sport in Papua New Guinea (especially in the highlands), which also unofficially holds the title as the national sport.The annual Australian State of Origin series matches are the most watched sporting event of the year. The West New Britain rugby league player, Marcus Bai, is a national celebrity, after he played for the National Rugby League with Melbourne Storm (he also played in the Super League competition). A new national competition started in 2005 called the SP Cup. Australian rules football was once the most popular sport in PNG until the 1970s. It is gaining popularity with the introduction of players at the top level into the AFL, including Mal Michael (Brisbane Lions) and James Gwilt (St Kilda Football Club/Essendon Football Club). PNG has the largest number of Australian rules footballers outside of Australia, and has one of the fastest growing junior development programs. The "Mosquitos", currently captained by Navu Maha, are the national team and were runners up in the Australian Football International Cup, in both 2003 (to Ireland) and 2005 (to New Zealand). Cricket has been traditionally popular in Papua New Guinea, where the British had the most influence. In the Trobriand Islands, cricket has become fused with the local culture, and a game played with stones instead of a ball and unlimited fielders has developed. It was introduced in 1903, by Methodist missionaries, and has become a beloved sport there.

See also
 Eharo mask
 Wild man syndrome

References

Further reading
 
 James Patrick Sinclair. The Arts of Papua New Guinea. (1977).
 Susan 'leows' Cochrane, Michael Mel. Contemporary Art in Papua New Guinea. (1997).
 Gloria Stewart. Introduction to Sepik Art of Papua New Guinea.
 The Stories of Pokop of Pohyomou. (Papua New Guinea University Press, 1996).

External links
 PNG Arts shop
 Papua New Guinea Art
 Oksapmin Society and World View Extracts from the ethnography of the Mountain Ok
 Cochrane Papua New Guinea Collection